Albert II or V of Brandenburg-Ansbach (18 September 1620 – 22 October 1667) was a German prince, who was Margrave of Ansbach from 1634 until his death.

Life

Born in Ansbach, Albert was the second son of Joachim Ernst, Margrave of Brandenburg-Ansbach (1582–1625) and his wife Sophie (1594–1651), daughter of John George, Count of Solms-Laubach. On Joachim Ernst's death Albert's elder brother Frederick III succeeded him in Ansbach from 1625 onwards, initially under their mother's guardianship, but he was killed without issue in the Thirty Years' War in 1634. Albert thus succeeded him, though again the early years of his rule were under his mother's guardianship, only taking up full government responsibilities when his minority ended in 1639.

With much diplomatic skill, he manoeuvred Brandenburg-Ansbach through the last ten years of the war and through administrative reforms, support for the guilds and cultural life and a good credit policy he promoted the beginnings of post-war reconstruction. He offered refuge to religious refugees from Austria and in 1647 or 1662 granted them lands in Treuchtlingen and Berolzheim. Albert's main advisor on this was his former teacher Johannes Limnäus. Active in the politics of the Holy Roman Empire, he sent troops to back the war against the Ottoman Empire.

A typical Baroque absolute ruler, he died at Ansbach in 1667. He was buried in the Johanniskirche in that city.

Marriage and issue

In Stuttgart on 31 August 1642 he married Henriette Louise (1623–1650), daughter of Louis Frederick, Duke of Württemberg-Montbéliard, with the following children:
 Sophie Elisabeth (*/†1643)
 Albertine Luise (1646–1670)
 Sophie Amalie (*/† 1649)

He married for a second time on 15 October 1651 at Oettingen, to Sophie Margarete (1634–1664), daughter of Joachim Ernst, Count of Oettingen-Oettingen, with the following children:

 Luise Sophie (1652–1668)
 John Frederick, Margrave of Brandenburg-Ansbach (1654–1686)
∞ 1. 1673 Princess Johanna Elisabeth of Baden-Durlach (1651–1680)
∞ 2. 1681 Princess Eleonore of Sachsen-Eisenach (1662–1696)
 Albrecht Ernst (1659–1674)
 Dorothea Charlotte (1661–1705)
∞ 1687 Ernest Louis, Landgrave of Hesse-Darmstadt (1667–1739)
 Eleonore Juliane (1663–1724)
∞ 1682 Frederick Charles, Duke of Württemberg-Winnental (1652–1698)

He married for a third time on 6 August 1665 in Durlach, to Christine (1645–1705), daughter of Frederick VI, Margrave of Baden-Durlach. This marriage was childless.

Ancestors

Sources
  Hanns Hubert Hofmann: Albrecht V.. In: Neue Deutsche Biographie (NDB). Band 1, Duncker & Humblot, Berlin 1953, S. 163 f. (Onlinefassung)
  M. Spindler, A. Kraus: Geschichte Frankens bis zum Ausgang des 18. Jahrhunderts, München 1997. 

1620 births
1667 deaths
Albert 02
People from Ansbach